True Panther Sounds (TPS) is a New York City-based independent record label founded by Dean Bein, previously owned by Matador Records and distributed by Beggars Group. The label began in 2004 in San Francisco to release a tour-only 7" by founders Bein and Samuel's band Red Tape Apocalypse. The label eventually moved to New York with Bein and was acquired by Matador Records in 2009. Artists released by the label represent many genres, including notable acts such as ABRA, Celeste, Glasser, Girls, King Krule, Tobias Jesso Jr., Shlohmo, and Slowthai.

About
True Panther was started in 2004 by Dean Bein, Molly Samuel, and Avi Klein to put out a tour-only 7" by Bein and Samuel's band Red Tape Apocalypse. The label moved with Bein from San Francisco to New York and continued to put out records from bands using a one-to-one project style, "putting money into something, praying it would sell enough to put out something else," as Bein explained in a recent interview with Microphone Memory Emotion.

An early success for the label came from the debut album from San Francisco-based band Girls. The album's release marked a joint venture between Matador and True Panther and became one of the most talked about indie albums of 2009, receiving critical praise from Pitchfork Media and The New York Times. A post on the Matador Records blog by founding partner Gerard Cosloy on November 4, 2009, stated, "After months of speculation (much of it in our own corridors), we can happily announce that Matador Records has purchased the True Panther Sounds label." This news ended rumors that Matador owned all or a percentage of True Panther. Cosloy went on to confirm that True Panther's future releases will be worked through the Matador marketing and promotion team.

Current artists

Catalogue artists

Releases
True Panther Sounds has released the following records:

Selected releases

See also
 List of record labels
 Independent record label
 Independent music

References

External links

American record labels
Companies based in New York City
Record labels established in 2004
Beggars Group